Tanner may be a surname of either English, German or Finnish origin. In the Finnish language surname the word  is a synonym for 'field' or 'ground'.

Arts and entertainment
 Alain Tanner (1929–2022), Swiss film-maker
 Antwon Tanner (born 1975), American actor
 Beatrice Stella Tanner (1865–1940), British actress known as Mrs. Patrick Campbell
 Charles R. Tanner (1896–1974), American science fiction and fantasy author

 Dorothy Tanner, (born 1923-2020), American artist
 Elmo Tanner (1904–1990), American whistler, bandleader, singer, and radio personality
 Erin Tanner (born 1985), American singer
 Franz Tanner, Swiss curler, World and European champion
 Gid Tanner (1885–1960), American fiddler
 Henry Ossawa Tanner (1859–1937), American painter
 James C. Tanner (1926-2019), American journalist
 James T. Tanner (1858–1915), English dramatist
 John Sigismund Tanner (1705–1775), British engraver, originally from Coburg in the Holy Roman Empire
 Jürg Tanner, Swiss curler, World and European champion
 Libby Tanner (born 1970), Australian actress
 Marion Tanner (born 1929), American actress known as Marion Marshall
 Paul Tanner (1917-2013), American musician
 Robin Tanner (artist) (1904–1988), British artist
 Stella Tanner (1925-2012), British actress
 Twila Tanner (born 1962), reality television contestant
 William Cunningham Deane-Tanner (1872–1922), American film director known as William Desmond Taylor

Characters
 Bill Tanner, from the James Bond series
 Elsie Tanner, a character in Coronation Street British soap opera
 D.J. Tanner, a character in Full House television series
 Danny Tanner, a character in Full House television series
 Evan Michael Tanner, from the novels of Lawrence Block
 Dennis Tanner, a character in Coronation Street British soap opera
 John "Jack" Tanner, a lead character in the George Bernard Shaw play Man and Superman (1903)
 Michelle Tanner, a character in Full House television series
 Officer John Tanner, main protagonist in the Driver video games
 Stephanie Tanner, a character in Full House television series
 Thomas and Cyril Tanner, characters from "The Infernal Devices" series by Cassandra Clare
 Vin Tanner, a character in The Magnificent Seven tv series.
 Tanner family, a character in ALF television series
 Tanner, a title character in an episode of the Daniel Boone television series

Health and science
 Adam Tanner (mathematician) (1572–1632), Austrian Jesuit mathematician and philosopher
 Amy Tanner (1870–1956), American psychologist 
 Halle Tanner Dillon Johnson (1864–1901), African-American physician
 Henry Schenck Tanner (1786–1858), American cartographer
 Joseph R. Tanner (born 1950), American astronaut
 James Mourilyan Tanner (1920–2010), British pediatrician
 Rosalind Tanner (1900-1992), German-English mathematician
 Väinö Tanner (1881–1948), Finnish geographer and diplomat
 Wilmer W. Tanner (1909–2011), American zoologist
 Zera Luther Tanner (1835–1906), American naval officer, inventor, and oceanographer
 Zorica Pantic-Tanner (born c. 1951), engineer

Politics
 Arto Tanner (1935–2002), Finnish diplomat
 Charles Albert Tanner (1887–1970), Canadian politician
 Gloria Tanner (born 1935), American politician
 H. B. Tanner (1922-2020), American politician and businessman
 John Riley Tanner (1844–1901), American politician
 John S. Tanner (born 1944), U.S. Congressman from Tennessee
Klaudia Tanner (born 1970), Austrian politician
 Lindsay Tanner (born 1956), Australian politician
 Myra Tanner Weiss (1917–1997), American communist
 Nathan Eldon Tanner (1898–1982), Canadian politician
 Tazewell B. Tanner (1821-1881), American politician
 Väinö Tanner (1881–1966), Finnish Prime Minister

Religion
 J. Paul Tanner (b. 1950), professor and author in the field of Old Testament studies
 Conrad Tanner (1752–1825), Swiss abbot
 Jacob Tanner (1865–1964), Norwegian American Lutheran educator and author
 Jerald and Sandra Tanner (1938–2006 and born 1941), American critics of the Church of Jesus Christ of Latter-day Saints
 Matthias Tanner (1630–1692), German Jesuit
 Nathan Eldon Tanner (1898–1982), Canadian politician & LDS leader
 Simon the Tanner (10th century), Coptic saint
 Thomas Tanner (bishop) (1674–1735), English bishop and antiquary
 Thomas Tanner (writer) (1630–1682), English clergyman and writer

Sports
 Adam Tanner (footballer) (born 1973), English footballer
 Chuck Tanner (born 1929), American baseball manager
 Elaine Tanner (born 1951), Canadian swimmer
 Evan Tanner (1971–2008), American mixed martial arts fighter
 Hamp Tanner (1927–2004), American football player
 Haydn Tanner (1917–2009), Welsh rugby player
 Lauri Tanner (1890–1950), Finnish gymnast and international footballer
 Nick Tanner (footballer) (born 1965), English footballer
 Ray Tanner (born 1958), American baseball coach
 Roscoe Tanner (born 1951), American tennis player
 Troy Tanner (born 1963), American volleyball player

Other
 Stephen J. Tanner, Canadian police officer
 Joseph Robson Tanner, English historian

See also
 Tanner (disambiguation)
 John Tanner (disambiguation)
 Thomas Tanner (disambiguation)

English-language surnames
Occupational surnames
English-language occupational surnames